Airways Corp of New Zealand v Geyserland Airways Ltd [1996] 1 NZLR 116 is a New Zealand legal case involving the legal concept of acceptance.

Background
IN 1987, the Airways Corporation of New Zealand (ACNZ) which was responsible for air traffic control in New Zealand was privatised.

In a bid to recoup its costs, it started charging airlines for providing this service. ACNZ gave Geyserland notice informing it that it was now subject to their "standard terms of contract", which included a term for the charging of landing fees, and they were subsequently invoiced for air control fees.

Geyserland refused to pay the charges, as they claimed they did not agree to any contract with them, even though they continued to request air traffic control services from ACNZ at the Rotorua airport. They pointed out that ACNZ were required by law to provide air traffic control services under the Civil Aviation Regulations 1953.

Left with no other option, ACNZ sued Geyserland for the unpaid landing fees.

Held
The Court ruled that as Geyserland had not accepted Airways contract, there was no legally binding contract between the two parties.

NOTE: The Court stated obiter, that Airways may have been successful if they had sued under Quantum Meruit i.e. they benefited from the improved air safety. For unknown reasons, this was never plead in court by ACNZ.

References

High Court of New Zealand cases
1996 in case law
1996 in New Zealand law
New Zealand contract case law